State Route 288 (SR 288) is a northwest-southeast state highway located in the northeast part of the U.S. state of Georgia. Its route is entirely within Towns County.

Route description
SR 288 begins at an intersection with US 76/SR 2/SR 17 west of Hiawassee. The route runs southeast, then northeast, then southeast again, before turning east to meet its eastern terminus, an intersection with US 76/SR 2/SR 17/SR 75 southeast of Hiawassee. Parts of the highway hug the southwestern shore of Lake Chatuge, and the highway provides access to the Lake Chatuge Recreation Area. The route serves as a functional bypass route for US 76 around Hiawassee, although it is longer than taking US 76 through downtown. The route is known as Sunnyside Road for its entire length.

History

Major intersections

See also

References

External links

288
Transportation in Towns County, Georgia